Japan is the third country in the world in production of paper (2011 figures). The leading Japanese company in the field (2015) is Oji Paper, with three other Japanese companiesSumitomo Forestry, Nippon Paper Group, and Unicharmalso in the world top 20.

See also
Pulp and paper industry
Environmental issues with paper

References

External links
TAPPI Technical Association of the Pulp and Paper Industry